Rohmingthanga Bawlte (born 2 January 1999) is an Indian professional footballer who plays as a forward for Rajasthan United in the I-League.

Career
After graduating from AIFF Elite Academy Bawlte was signed by Chennaiyin B in October 2017. 
He was sent on loan to Indian Arrows in 2019-20 season. He made his professional debut for the Indian Arrows side in the Arrow's first match of the 2019–20 season against Aizawl F.C. He was brought in 87th minute as Indian Arrows lost 0–1.

Real Kashmir
In November 2021, Bawlte signed for the Snow Leopards ahead of the 2021–22 season. On 27 December, he made his debut against his former club Aizawl, which ended in a thrilling 3–2 win. He came on as a 90th-minute substitute for Tiago Adan.

Rajasthan United
In August 2022, I-League club Rajasthan United roped in Bawlte, on a three-year deal.

Career statistics

Club

Honours
Rajasthan United
Baji Rout Cup: 2022

References

1999 births
Living people
People from Lunglei
Indian footballers
Indian Arrows players
Footballers from Mizoram
I-League players
Association football forwards
Chennaiyin FC B players
Chennaiyin FC players
Real Kashmir FC players
Aizawl FC players
Rajasthan United FC players